JSC Novosibirsk Aircraft Production Association Plant named after V.P. Chkalov (NAPO) is one of the largest aerospace manufacturers in Russia.

The company produces Su-34 fighter-bombers. It is also involved in the Sukhoi Superjet 100 program, where it is one of the two main production sites. NAPO focuses on component production for the program, while the main assembly line is at Komsomolsk-on-Amur Aircraft Production Association. NAPO also conducts repair and upgrade work on Su-24M frontline bombers. In addition, the company is involved in pilot training and education of engineering personnel, as well as production of consumer goods.

The company is based in the city of Novosibirsk. It has about 10,000 employees.

References

External links
Company website (Russian)

Sukhoi
Aircraft manufacturers of the Soviet Union
Manufacturing companies based in Novosibirsk